Prey Chhor is a district (srok) located in Kampong Cham province, Cambodia. The district capital is Prey Totueng town located around 29 kilometres east of the provincial capital of Kampong Cham  and 95 kilometres north west of Phnom Penh by road. Prey Chhor is a central district of Kampong Cham and is surrounded by other Kampong Cham districts.

The district is easily accessed by road from Kampong Cham city, Phnom Penh and Kampong Thom. The district capital is a busy market town that lies at an important crossroads. It lies on National Highway 7 between Phnom Penh and Kampong Cham. National road 70 to Kang Meas begins at the district capital and National road 62 begins in Prey Chhor and links National Highway 7 with National Highway 6 to Kampong Thom and the north.

Tuk Chhar Resort 
Prey Chhor district is home to Tuk Chhar resort, a recreation area of natural and historic attractions popular with local and international visitors. The area includes a natural spring of 3 cubic metres. The water from the spring is used to generate hydroelectric power and the run-off area is a popular swimming site. Also nearby are several ancient temples called Preah Theat Teuk Chhar. These temples were constructed in AD 1005, during the reign of King Suryavarman I.

Location 
Prey Chhor district is a central district of Kampong Cham Province. Reading from the north clockwise, Prey Chhor shares a border with Baray district of Kampong Thom province and Chamkar Leu district of Kampong Cham to the north. Chamkar Leu continues down to the eastern border of the district where the border with Kampong Siem district begins. To the south is Kang Meas district and the western border of the district is shared with Cheung Prey district.

Administration 
The Prey Chhor district governor is Mr. Meas Tuok. He reports to Hun Neng, the Governor of Kampong Cham. The following table shows the villages of Prey Chhor district by commune.

Demographics 
The district is subdivided into 15 communes (khum) and 176 villages (phum). According to the 1998 Census, the population of the district was 127,683 persons in 24,892 households in 1998. With a population of over 120,000 people, Prey Chhor district has the second largest district population in Kampong Cham province after Tbong Kmom district. The average household size in Prey Chhor is 5.1 persons per household, which is slightly lower than the rural average for Cambodia (5.2 persons). The sex ratio in the district is 93.5%, with significantly more females than males.

References 

Districts of Kampong Cham province